German submarine U-281 was a Type VIIC U-boat of Nazi Germany's Kriegsmarine during World War II.

The submarine was laid down on 7 May 1942 at the Bremer Vulkan yard at Bremen-Vegesack as yard number 46. She was launched on 16 January 1943 and commissioned on 27 February under the command of Kapitänleutnant Heinz von Davidson.

Design
German Type VIIC submarines were preceded by the shorter Type VIIB submarines. U-281 had a displacement of  when at the surface and  while submerged. She had two shafts and two  propellers.

U-281 was fitted with five  torpedo tubes (four fitted at the bow and one at the stern), fourteen torpedoes, one  SK C/35 naval gun, 220 rounds, and two twin  C/30 anti-aircraft guns. The boat had a complement of between forty-four and sixty.

Service history
U-279 served with the 8th U-boat Flotilla for training from February to July 1943 and operationally with the 7th flotilla from 1 August. She carried out four patrols, but sank no ships. She was a member of 11 wolfpacks.

First patrol
After two short voyages in Norwegian waters, the boat headed for occupied France, departing Kiel on 6 October 1943, the 'long' way round the British Isles. She passed between Iceland and the Faroe Islands and into the Atlantic Ocean. She was attacked by a B-24 Liberator east of Cape Farewell (Greenland) on the 17th. The aircraft's depth charges fell short, but three men were wounded by machine gun fire. The submarine arrived at St. Nazaire on 26 November.

Second patrol
U-281s second patrol was to mid-Atlantic and at 61 days, was to be her longest.

Third patrol
By contrast, her third patrol was the shortest; she did not get out of the Bay of Biscay.

Return to Germany and surrender
She then made the short journey from St. Nazaire to La Pallice, further south along the French Atlantic coast in August 1944, before undertaking the longer voyage to Kristiansand in Norway, again negotiating the gap between Iceland and the Faroes, but in the other direction. She did not stay in Norway long, arriving at Flensburg on 5 November 1944.

The submarine surrendered at Kristiansand-Sud on 9 May 1945. She was transferred to Loch Ryan in Scotland via Scapa Flow for Operation Deadlight. She was sunk on 30 November 1945.

U-281 appears in the film The Cruel Sea after her surrender (approx 1 hour 57 minutes into the film).

Wolfpacks
U-281 took part in eleven wolfpacks, namely:
 Schlieffen (16 – 22 October 1943) 
 Siegfried (22 – 27 October 1943) 
 Siegfried 2 (27 – 30 October 1943) 
 Körner (30 October – 2 November 1943) 
 Tirpitz 3 (2 – 8 November 1943) 
 Eisenhart 9 (9 – 11 November 1943) 
 Rügen (14 – 26 January 1944) 
 Hinein (26 January – 3 February 1944) 
 Igel 2 (3 – 17 February 1944) 
 Hai 2 (17 – 22 February 1944) 
 Preussen (22 – 23 February 1944)

References

Bibliography

External links

German Type VIIC submarines
U-boats commissioned in 1943
U-boats sunk in 1945
World War II submarines of Germany
World War II shipwrecks in the Atlantic Ocean
1943 ships
Ships built in Bremen (state)
Operation Deadlight
Maritime incidents in November 1945